Talmadge "Tab" Prince (February 16, 1938 – February 19, 1970) was an American stock car racing driver.

Early life
Talmadge Prince was born February 16, 1938, in Cullman, Alabama. He was the fourth of six children born to William Taft Prince and Marie Cryer Prince.  In 1969 he bought a 50% share of a Chrysler/Plymouth dealership in Dublin, Georgia.  He financed the purchase using the proceeds from the sale of his business, PBR Electronics, to his older brother, William Lloyd Prince.

Talmadge was married twice.  In 1959 he married Jeanette Ellen Looney.  They had two children.  He married his second wife, Nell Sutton, in 1969.  They had one son who was born after his death.

Racing career
Prince started racing cars in the early 1960s, racing sprint and Late Model Sportsman cars on short tracks in the American South. In 1970, he entered his first NASCAR Grand National Series event, the Daytona 500. Prince's career only lasted a very unfortunate 18 laps.

Fatal accident
In the second of the two 125 mile qualifying races for the Daytona 500 he blew an engine on his Dodge Daytona and went into a slide. Bill Seifert, who was following behind Prince, got into oil, lost control, and crashed head on into the driver's door of Prince's car. Prince was killed instantly. He was buried at the Roselawn Cemetery in Decatur, Alabama, and was survived by two sons and a daughter.
His crash was similar to Harold Kite's fatal crash in 1965.

Motorsports career results

NASCAR
(key) (Bold - Pole position awarded by qualifying time. Italics - Pole position earned by points standings or practice time. * – Most laps led.)

Grand National Series

References

External links
 

1938 births
1970 deaths
People from Cullman, Alabama
Racing drivers from Alabama
NASCAR drivers
Burials in Alabama
Sports deaths in Florida
Racing drivers who died while racing